Gordon Hynes may refer to:

 Gord Hynes (born 1966), retired Canadian ice hockey defenceman
 Gordon Hynes (footballer) (born 1944), former Australian rules footballer